Adrian Šemper (born 12 January 1998) is a Croatian footballer who plays as goalkeeper for  club Genoa.

Club career

Early career
Born in Zagreb, Šemper started his football career with GNK Dinamo Zagreb youth academy in 2004. He was one of the brightest talents of a very interesting generation of Dinamo Zagreb players born in 1998, including Josip Brekalo, Nikola Moro, Borna Sosa, Branimir Kalaica and Vinko Soldo.

Dinamo Zagreb
In 2016, Šemper signed his first professional contract with Dinamo Zagreb. He made his league debut on 6 May 2016 against NK Slaven Belupo at Gradski stadion which Dinamo Zagreb won 3–0. In this match, he played 90 minutes whole the game and he lost on goals. On 16 January 2016, Chelsea made an offer of Šemper to Dinamo Zagreb for £3.1 million, but Dinamo Zagreb rejected the offer and Šemper remained in Dinamo. In the 2015–16 season Šemper made his professional debut and Dinamo Zagreb achieved the double of league and cup.

Chievo
On 9 August 2018, Šemper joined to Italian Serie A club Chievo Verona on loan with an option to buy. He made his league debut on 20 April 2019 in a 2–1 away win against Lazio.

On 11 June 2020, Chievo bought out his rights and he signed a four-year contract with the club.

Genoa
On 11 August 2021 Śemper signed with Serie A club Genoa.

International career
Šemper has represented his country at various age groups, most recently for the Croatia national under-19 football team. In 2015, he played 2015 UEFA European Under-17 Championship and 2015 FIFA U-17 World Cup. Since March 2016, he has been member of Croatia national under-19 football team.

Career statistics

Club

Honours

Club

Dinamo Zagreb
Croatian First Football League (1): 2015–16

References

External links
 

1998 births
Living people
Footballers from Zagreb
Croatian Football League players
GNK Dinamo Zagreb players
NK Lokomotiva Zagreb players
A.C. ChievoVerona players
Genoa C.F.C. players
Association football goalkeepers
Croatian expatriate footballers
Expatriate footballers in Italy
Serie A players
Serie B players
Croatia under-21 international footballers
Croatia youth international footballers